Atlético Rio Negro Clube, usually known simply as Rio Negro is a traditional Brazilian football club from Manaus, Amazonas state.

Rio Negro is the second oldest club of Amazonas state, and is eleven months younger than its rival, Nacional. Atlético Rio Negro Clube of Roraima state is named after the club, and shares the same logo, colors and kits.

History
On November 13, 1913, 14-year-old Shinda Uchôa and his friends founded Atlético Rio Negro Clube at Manuel Afonso do Nascimento (who was one of the founders) home. The club was named after the Negro River. Rio Negro's first president was Edgar Lobão. Shinda Uchôa was nominated president of honor. In 1921, Rio Negro won its first title, the state championship.

In 1973, the club competed in the Campeonato Brasileiro Série A for the first time, finishing in the 30th position. In the following year, in 1974, Rio Negro finished in Campeonato Brasileiro Série A's 26th position, ahead of Botafogo. That was the club's all-time best position in the competition. In 1986, the club competed in the Campeonato Brasileiro Série A for the last time, finishing in the 41st position. In 1989, Rio Negro competed Copa do Brasil's first edition. The club was eliminated in the first round by Vasco da Gama of Rio de Janeiro. In the first leg, in Manaus, Vasco and Rio Negro drew 1–1, and in the second leg, in Rio de Janeiro, Vasco won 2–1.

Titles
Campeonato Amazonense: 1921, 1927, 1931, 1932, 1938, 1940, 1943, 1962, 1965, 1975, 1982, 1987, 1988, 1989, 1990, 2001.
Campeonato Amazonense Second Division: 1917, 2008, 2022

Stadium

Rio Negro's home stadium is Vivaldão, inaugurated in 1961, with a maximum capacity of 43,000 people.

Only one training ground is owned by the club. Campo de Treinamento Rinha do Galo is located in Manaus.

Rivals
Rio Negro biggest rivals are Nacional (AM) and São Raimundo (AM). The derby against Nacional is called Rio-Nal, and is an old and traditional city derby, which is considered one of the biggest derbies of the city. The derby against São Raimundo is one of the new derbies of the city, and it started due to the successful performance of São Raimundo in recent years.

Symbols
The club's mascot is called Galo Carijó, which is a rooster species. The club has several different nicknames, such as clube barriga-preta (meaning black belly club, which is a reference to the club's home kit), galo carijó (carijó rooster), time da Praça da Saudade (Saudade Town Square team), clube da elite (elite club) and negão (big black). Rio Negro's colors are black and white.

Ultra groups
There are several ultra groups supporting the club:

Galo Hulk
Galoucura

Other sports
Besides football, Rio Negro also has other sports sections, such as basketball, volleyball, gymnastics, and futsal.

References

External links
Rio Negro at Arquivo de Clubes
 Fansite

Association football clubs established in 1913
Football clubs in Amazonas (Brazilian state)
1913 establishments in Brazil